United States v. Indianapolis & St. Louis Railroad Co., 113 U.S. 711 (1885), regarded a suit that was brought to foreclose mortgages given to secure bonds issued by the Indianapolis and St. Louis Railroad Company. A final decree of foreclosure having been passed, the mortgaged property was sold, and the sale was confirmed by the court. The United States intervened by petition, and asked that certain sums, alleged to be due to the government on account of taxes, be first paid out of the proceeds.

It appeared that certain interest coupons of the bonds of the company were payable and were paid on the first days of September and November 1870, and that certain other interest coupons of the same company were payable on the first day of January 1872, and were then paid out of its earnings made prior to that date and during the year 1871.

The court below held:

That the Act of July 14, 1870, 16 Stat. 269, c. 255, § 15, did not impose an internal revenue tax on interest coupons of the bonds of the railroad company payable and paid during the last five months of that year.
That the law did not impose an internal revenue tax on interest coupons of such bonds payable and paid on the first day of January 1872.

The United States acquiesces in the judgment in respect to the first of these claims, but contends that the Act of July 14, 1870, imposed a tax upon interest coupons that were paid out of the corporation earnings for 1871, although such payment was not due nor made until January 1, 1872. This question depends upon the construction of § 15 of the act of 1870, which provides:

In construing this section in Railroad Co. v. United States, 101 U. S. 550, the Court said:

The judgment was affirmed.

See also
List of United States Supreme Court cases, volume 113

References

External links
 

United States Supreme Court cases
United States Supreme Court cases of the Waite Court
1885 in United States case law
Cleveland, Cincinnati, Chicago and St. Louis Railway
Railway litigation in 1885
Foreclosure